Gimel is a board game published by Bütehorn Spiele in 1980.

Gameplay
Gimel is an abstract strategy game.

Reviews
Games & Puzzles #78
Jeux & Stratégie #2

References

External links
 

Board games introduced in 1980